Krzysztof Eugeniusz Penderecki (23 November 1933 – 29 March 2020) was a Polish composer and conductor. His best known works include Threnody to the Victims of Hiroshima, Symphony No. 3, his St Luke Passion, Polish Requiem, Anaklasis and Utrenja. Penderecki's oeuvre includes four operas, eight symphonies and other orchestral pieces, a variety of instrumental concertos, choral settings of mainly religious texts, as well as chamber and instrumental works.

Born in Dębica, Penderecki studied music at Jagiellonian University and the Academy of Music in Kraków. After graduating from the Academy, he became a teacher there and began his career as a composer in 1959 during the Warsaw Autumn festival. His Threnody to the Victims of Hiroshima for string orchestra and the choral work St. Luke Passion have received popular acclaim. His first opera, The Devils of Loudun, was not immediately successful. In the mid-1970s, Penderecki became a professor at the Yale School of Music. Beginning in the mid-1970s, Penderecki's composition style changed, with his first violin concerto focusing on the semitone and the tritone. His choral work Polish Requiem was written in the 1980s and expanded in 1993 and 2005.

Penderecki won many prestigious awards, including the Prix Italia in 1967 and 1968; the Wihuri Sibelius Prize of 1983; four Grammy Awards in 1987, 1998 (twice), and 2017; the Wolf Prize in Arts in 1987; and the University of Louisville Grawemeyer Award for Music Composition in 1992. In 2012, Sean Michaels of The Guardian called him 'arguably Poland's greatest living composer'. In 2020 the composer's Alma Mater, the Academy of Music in Kraków, was named after Krzysztof Penderecki.

Career

1933–1958: Early years
Penderecki was born on 23 November 1933 in Dębica, the son of Zofia and Tadeusz Penderecki, a lawyer. Penderecki's grandfather, Robert Berger, was a highly talented painter and director of the local bank at the time of Penderecki's birth; Robert's father Johann, a German Protestant, moved to Dębica from Breslau (now Wrocław) in the mid-19th century. Out of love for his wife, he subsequently converted to Catholicism. Penderecki's grandmother Stefania was an Armenian from Stanislau in Austria-Hungary (present-day Ivano-Frankivsk in Western Ukraine). Penderecki used to go to the Armenian Church in Kraków with her. He was the youngest of three siblings; his sister, Barbara, was married to a mining engineer, and his older brother, Janusz, was studying law and medicine at the time of his birth. Tadeusz was a violinist and also played piano.

In 1939, the Second World War broke out, and Penderecki's family moved out of their apartment, as the Ministry of Food was to operate there. After the war, Penderecki began attending grammar school in 1946. He began studying the violin under Stanisław Darłak, Dębica's military bandmaster who organized an orchestra for the local music society after the war. Upon graduating from grammar school, Penderecki moved to Kraków in 1951, where he attended Jagiellonian University. 

He studied violin with Stanisław Tawroszewicz and music theory with Franciszek Skołyszewski. In 1954, Penderecki entered the Academy of Music in Kraków and, having finished his studies on violin after his first year, focused entirely on composition. Penderecki's main teacher there was Artur Malawski, a composer known for his choral and orchestral works, as well as chamber music and songs. After Malawski's death in 1957, Penderecki took further lessons with Stanisław Wiechowicz, a composer primarily known for his choral works. At the time, the 1956 overthrow of Stalinism in Poland lifted strict cultural censorship and opened the door to a wave of creativity.

1958–1962: First compositions
Upon graduating from the Academy of Music in Kraków in 1958, Penderecki took up a teaching post at the Academy. His early works show the influence of Anton Webern and Pierre Boulez (Penderecki was also influenced by Igor Stravinsky). Penderecki's international recognition began in 1959 at the Warsaw Autumn with the premieres of the works Strophen, Psalms of David, and Emanations, but the piece that truly brought him to international attention was Threnody to the Victims of Hiroshima (see threnody and atomic bombing of Hiroshima), written in 1960 for 52 string instruments. In it, he makes use of extended instrumental techniques (for example, playing behind the bridge, bowing on the tailpiece). There are many novel textures in the work, which makes extensive use of tone clusters. He originally titled the work 8' 37", but decided to dedicate it to the victims of Hiroshima.

Fluorescences followed a year later; it increases the orchestral density with more wind and brass, and an enormous percussion section of 32 instruments for six players, including a Mexican güiro, typewriters, gongs and other unusual instruments. The piece was composed for the Donaueschingen Festival of contemporary music of 1962, and its performance was regarded as provocative and controversial. Even the score appeared revolutionary; the form of graphic notation that Penderecki had developed rejected the familiar look of notes on a staff, instead representing music as morphing sounds. His intentions at this stage were quite Cagean: 'All I'm interested in is liberating sound beyond all tradition'.

Another noteworthy piece of this period is the Canon for 52 strings and 2 tapes. This is in a similar style to other pieces in the late 1950s in its use of sound masses, dramatically juxtaposed with traditional means although the use of standard techniques or idioms is often disguised or distorted. Indeed, the Canon brings to mind the choral tradition and indeed the composer has the players sing, albeit with the performance indication of bocca chiusa (with closed mouth) at various points; nevertheless, Penderecki uses the 52 'voices' of the string orchestra to play in massed glissandi and harmonics at times – this is then recorded by one of the tapes for playback later on in the piece. It was performed at the Warsaw Autumn Festival in 1962 and caused a riot although curiously the rioters were young music students and not older concertgoers.

At the same time, he started composing music for theater and film. The first theater performance with Penderecki's music was Złoty kluczyk (Golden Little Key) by Yekaterina Borysowa directed by Władysław Jarema (premiered on 12 May 1957 in Krakow at the "Groteska" Puppet Theater). In 1959, at the Cartoon Film Studio in Bielsko-Biała, he composed the music for the first animated film, Bulandra i diabeł (Coal Miner Bulandra and Devil), directed by Jerzy Zitzman and Lechosław Marszałek.

In 1959, he wrote the score for Jan Łomnicki's first short fiction film, Nie ma końca wielkiej wojny (There is no End to the Great War, WFDiF Warszawa). In the following years, he created over twenty original musical settings for dramatic and over 40 puppet performances, and composed original music for at least eleven documentary and feature films as well as for twenty-five animated films for adults and children.

The St. Luke Passion

The large-scale St. Luke Passion (1963–66) brought Penderecki further popular acclaim, not least because it was devoutly religious, yet written in an avant-garde musical language, and composed within Communist Eastern Europe. Various different musical styles can be seen in the piece. The experimental textures, such as were employed in the Threnody, are balanced by the work's Baroque form and the occasional use of more traditional harmonic and melodic writing. Penderecki makes use of serialism in this piece, and one of the tone rows he uses includes the BACH motif, which acts as a bridge between the conventional and more experimental elements. The Stabat Mater section toward the end of the piece concludes on a simple chord of D major, and this gesture is repeated at the very end of the work, which finishes on a triumphant E major chord. These are the only tonal harmonies in the work, and both come as a surprise to the listener; Penderecki's use of tonal triads such as these remains a controversial aspect of the work.

Penderecki continued to write sacred music. In the early 1970s he wrote a Dies irae, a Magnificat, and Canticum Canticorum Salomonis (Song of Songs) for chorus and orchestra.

De Natura Sonoris and other pieces in the 1960s and early 1970s

Penderecki's preoccupation with sound culminated in De Natura Sonoris I (1966), which frequently calls upon the orchestra to use non-standard playing techniques to produce original sounds and colours. A sequel, De Natura Sonoris II, was composed in 1971: with its more limited orchestra, it incorporates more elements of post-Romanticism than its predecessor. This foreshadowed Penderecki's renunciation of the avant-garde in the mid-1970s, although both pieces feature dramatic glissandos, dense clusters, use of harmonics, and unusual instruments (the musical saw features in the second piece).

In 1968 Penderecki received the State Prize 1st class. During the jubilee of the People's Republic of Poland he received the Commander's Cross (1974) and Knight's Cross of Order of Polonia Restituta (1964).

Towards the end of the decade, Penderecki received a commission to write for the twenty-fifth anniversary of the founding of the United Nations. The result was Kosmogonia, a piece of twenty minutes for 3 soloists (soprano, tenor, bass), mixed choir and orchestra. The Los Angeles Philharmonic premiered the piece on 24 October 1970 with Zubin Mehta as conductor and Robert Nagy as tenor. The piece uses texts from ancient writers Sophocles and Ovid in addition to contemporary statements from Soviet and American astronauts to musically explore the idea of the cosmos.

1970s–2020: Later years

In the mid-1970s, while he was a professor at the Yale School of Music, Penderecki's style began to change. The Violin Concerto No. 1 largely leaves behind the dense tone clusters with which he had been associated, and instead focuses on two melodic intervals: the semitone and the tritone. This direction continued with the Symphony No. 2 (1980), which is harmonically and melodically quite straightforward; the symphony is sometimes referred to as the "Christmas Symphony" due to the opening phrase of the Christmas carol Silent Night appearing three times during the work.

Penderecki explained this shift by stating that he had come to feel that the experimentation of the avant-garde had gone too far from the expressive, non-formal qualities of Western music: 'The avant-garde gave one an illusion of universalism. The musical world of Stockhausen, Nono, Boulez and Cage was for us, the young – hemmed in by the aesthetics of socialist realism, then the official canon in our country – a liberation...I was quick to realise however, that this novelty, this experimentation, and formal speculation, is more destructive than constructive; I realised the Utopian quality of its Promethean tone'. Penderecki concluded that he was 'saved from the avant-garde snare of formalism by a return to tradition'. Penderecki wrote relatively little chamber music. However, compositions for smaller ensembles range in date from the start of his career to the end, reflecting the changes his style of writing has undergone.

In 1975 the Lyric Opera of Chicago asked him to write a work to commemorate the US Bicentennial in 1976; this became the opera Paradise Lost. Delays to the project however meant it did not see its premiere until 1978. The music continued to illustrate Penderecki's move away from avant-garde techniques: it is tonal music and the composer explained: 'This is not music by the angry young man I used to be'.

In 1980, Penderecki was commissioned by Solidarity to compose a piece to accompany the unveiling of a statue at the Gdańsk shipyards to commemorate those killed in anti-government riots there in 1970. Penderecki responded with Lacrimosa, which he later expanded into one of the best-known works of his later period, the Polish Requiem (1980–84, 1993, 2005). Later, he tended towards more traditionally conceived tonal constructs, as heard in works such as the Cello Concerto No. 2 and the Credo, which received the Grammy Award for best choral performance for the world-premiere recording made by the Oregon Bach Festival, which commissioned the piece. The same year, Penderecki was awarded the Prince of Asturias Prize in Spain, one of the highest honours given in Spain to individuals, entities, organizations or others from around the world who make notable achievements in the sciences, arts, humanities, or public affairs. Invited by Walter Fink, he was the eleventh composer featured in the annual Komponistenporträt of the Rheingau Musik Festival in 2001. He conducted the Credo on the occasion of the 70th birthday of Helmuth Rilling, 29 May 2003. Penderecki received an honorary doctorate from the Seoul National University, Korea, in 2005 and the University of Münster, Germany, in 2006. His notable students include Chester Biscardi and Walter Mays. 

In celebration of his 75th birthday, he conducted three of his works at the Rheingau Musik Festival in 2008, among them Ciaccona from the Polish Requiem.

In 2010, he worked on an opera based on Phèdre by Racine for 2014, which was never realized, and expressed his wish to write a 9th symphony. In 2014, he was engaged in the creation of a choral work to coincide with the Armenian genocide centennial. In 2018, he conducted Credo in Kyiv at the 29th Kyiv Music Fest, marking the centenary of Polish independence.

Personal life
Penderecki had three children, first a daughter Beata with pianist Barbara Penderecka ( Graca), whom he married in 1954. They later divorced. He then had a son, Łukasz (b. 1966), and daughter, Dominika (b. 1971), with his second wife, Elżbieta Penderecka ( Solecka), whom he married on 19 December 1965. He lived in the Kraków suburb of Wola Justowska. He was also a keen gardener and established a 15-hectare arboretum near his manor house in Lusławice.

Penderecki died after a long illness in his home in Kraków, Poland, on 29 March 2020. He was buried at the National Pantheon in Kraków on 29 March 2022.

Legacy 

In 1979, a bronze bust by artist Marian Konieczny honouring Penderecki was unveiled in The Gallery of Composers' Portraits at the Pomeranian Philharmonic in Bydgoszcz. His monument is located on the Celebrity Alley at the Scout Square (Skwer Harcerski) in Kielce.

The Led Zeppelin guitarist and founding member Jimmy Page was an admirer of the composer's groundbreaking work Threnody to the Victims of Hiroshima during his teenage years. This would be reflected later by Page's use of the violin bow on his guitar.
 
The composer and Radiohead guitarist Jonny Greenwood cited Penderecki as a major influence. For Radiohead's 1997 album OK Computer, Greenwood wrote a part for 16 stringed instruments playing quarter tones apart, inspired by Penderecki. Greenwood visited Penderecki in 2012 and wrote a work for strings, 48 Responses to Polymorphia, which Penderecki conducted in various performances throughout Europe. Penderecki credited Greenwood for introducing his music to a new generation.

Works

Penderecki's compositions include operas, symphonies, choral works, as well as chamber and instrumental music.

Film and television scores
Krzysztof Penderecki composed between 1959 and 1968 original music for at least eleven documentary and feature films as well as for twenty-five animated films for adults and children.

Some of Penderecki's music has been adapted for film soundtracks. The Exorcist (1973) features his String Quartet and Kanon For Orchestra and Tape; fragments of the Cello Concerto and The Devils of Loudun. Writing about The Exorcist, the film critic for The New Republic wrote that 'even the music is faultless, most of it by Krzysztof Penderecki, who at last is where he belongs'. Stanley Kubrick's The Shining (1980) features six pieces of Penderecki's music: Utrenja II: Ewangelia, Utrenja II: Kanon Paschy, The Awakening of Jacob, De Natura Sonoris No. 1, De Natura Sonoris No. 2 and Polymorphia. David Lynch has used Penderecki's music in the soundtracks of the films Wild at Heart (1990), Inland Empire (2006), and the TV series Twin Peaks (2017). In the film Fearless (1993) by Peter Weir, the piece Polymorphia was once again used for an intense plane crash scene, seen from the point of view of the passenger played by Jeff Bridges. Penderecki's Threnody for the Victims of Hiroshima was also used during one of the final sequences in the film Children of Men (2006). Penderecki composed music for Andrzej Wajda's 2007 Academy Award nominated film Katyń, while Martin Scorsese's Shutter Island (2010) featured his Symphony No. 3 and Fluorescences.

Some of Penderecki's oeuvre inspired Jonny Greenwood of Radiohead to release an album, which thereafter appeared in his score for There Will Be Blood, a 2007 Paul Thomas Anderson film.

Honors and awards

 1959: 2nd Competition for Young Polish Composers in Warsaw organised by the Composers' Union – Penderecki was awarded the top three prizes for the works he anonymously submitted: Stanzas, Emanations, and Psalms of David;
 1961: Prize of the UNESCO International Tribune of Composers in Paris for Threnody;
 1966: Grand Art Prize of North Rhine-Westphalia for St. Luke Passion;
 1967: Prix Italia for the St. Luke Passion; Sibelius Gold Medal;
 1968: Prix Italia for the Dies Irae in memory of the victims of Auschwitz; Grammy Trustees Award for significant contributions, other than performance, to the field of recording;
 1972: City of Kraków Award;
 1977: Herder Prize (Germany/Austria)
 1978: Prix Arthur Honegger for Magnificat (France)
 1983: Wihuri Sibelius Prize (Finland); Polish National Award
 1985: Premio Lorenzo Magnifico (Italy)
 1987: Wolf Prize in Arts (Israel); Grammy for Best Contemporary Composition
 1990: Grand Cross of Merit of the Order of Merit of the Federal Republic of Germany; Chevalier de Saint Georges;
 1992: University of Louisville Grawemeyer Award for Music Composition for Adagio – 4 Symphony; Austrian Medal for Science and Art;
 1993: Distinguished Citizen Fellowship at the Institute for Advanced Study at Indiana University, Bloomington, Prize of the International Music Council / UNESCO for Music; Cultural Merit of the Principality of Monaco
 1995: Member of the Royal Irish Academy of Music (Dublin); honorary citizen of Strasbourg; Primetime Emmy Award of the Academy of Television Arts & Sciences; Pro Baltica Prize
 1996: Primetime Emmy Award of the Academy of Television Arts & Sciences, Commander of the Ordre des Arts et des Lettres (France)
 1998: Grammy for Best Instrumental Soloist Performance; Composition Prize for the Promotion of the European economy, Foreign Honorary Member of the American Academy of Arts and Letters; corresponding member of the Bavarian Academy of Fine Arts, Munich; Order of the Lithuanian Grand Duke Gediminas (Lithuania)
 1999: Music Prize of the City of Duisburg (Germany); Honorary Board of the Vilnius Festival '99
 2000: Cannes Classical Award as "Living Composer of the Year"; honorary member of the Society of Friends of Music in Vienna; Officer of the Order of Merit of the Italian Republic;
 2001: Prince of Asturias Award for Art (Spain); Grammy for Best Choral Performance for Credo; Honorary Professor of the Hong Kong Academy for Performing Arts
 2002: State Prize of North Rhine-Westphalia (Germany), Romano Guardini Prize
 2003: Grand Gold Decoration for Services to the Republic of Austria; Preis der Europäischen Kirchenmusik (Germany), Freedom of Dębica, Eduardo M. Torner Medal of the Conservatorio de Musica del Principado Asturias in Oviedo, Spain; honorary director of the Choir of the Prince of Asturias Foundation, Honorary President of the Apayo a la Creación Musical, Judaica Foundation Medal;
 2004: Praemium Imperiale – Music (Japan)
 2005: Order of the White Eagle (Poland); Gold Medal for Merit to Culture – Gloria Artis
 2006: Order of the Three Stars (Latvia)
 2008: Polish Academy Award for Best Film Score for Katyn, Commander of the Order of the Three Stars (Latvia), Order of Bernardo O'Higgins (Chile), Golden Medal of the Minister of Culture (Armenia), Commander of the Order of the Lion of Finland; Thorunium Medal
 2009: Order of Merit of the Grand Duchy of Luxembourg; Merit of Armenia
 2011: Viadrina Prize for contributions to Polish-German cooperation (Viadrina European University, Frankfurt); Grand Cross of the Order pro Merito Melitensi (Malta)
 2012: Paszport Polityki Award
 2014: Order of the Cross of Terra Mariana, 1st Class (Estonia)
 2015: Per Artem ad Deum Medal
 2017: Grammy for Best Choral Performance; New Culture of New Europe Award at the Krynica Economic Forum.

Penderecki was an honorary doctor and honorary professor of several universities: Georgetown University, Washington, D.C., University of Glasgow, Moscow Tchaikovsky Conservatory, Fryderyk Chopin Music Academy in Warsaw, Seoul National University, Universities of Rochester, Bordeaux, Leuven, Belgrade, Madrid, Poznan and St. Olaf College (Northfield, Minnesota), Duquesne University, Pontifical Catholic University of Peru, University of Pittsburgh (PA), University of St. Petersburg, Beijing Conservatory, Yale University and Westfälische Wilhelms-Universität in Münster (Westphalia) (2006 Faculty of Arts).

He was an honorary member of the following academies and music companies: Royal Academy of Music (London), Accademia Nazionale di Santa Cecilia (Rome), Royal Swedish Academy of Music (Stockholm), Academy of Arts (London), Academia Nacional de Bellas Artes (Buenos Aires), the Society of Friends of Music in Vienna, Academy of Arts in Berlin, Académie Internationale de Philosophie et de l'Art in Bern, and the Académie Nationale des Sciences, Belles-lettres et Arts in Bordeaux. In 2009, he became an honorary citizen of the city of Bydgoszcz.

See also
List of Polish composers
Music of Poland
Lusławice

References

Sources

Further reading
 
 
 
  continued on page 74
  continued on page G7

External links

 "Penderecki's violin revolution in Poland"  (Drowned In Sound, 2012)
 Krzysztof Penderecki interview by Bruce Duffie (March 2000)
 Interview with Krzysztof Penderecki by Galina Zhukova (2011), Журнал reMusik, Saint-Petersburg Contemporary Music Center.
 "Krzysztof Penderecki: Turning history into avant-garde". Video interview by Louisiana Channel, Denmark, 2013.
 
 Krzysztof Penderecki, Culture.pl
 Krzysztof Penderecki's biography on Cdmc website
 
 
 Not Just 'The Shining': 13 Soundtracks Featuring Krzysztof Penderecki on Culture.pl
 Musical Trace Pendereckis' film & theatre music (Polish only)
 Penderecki's Garden, digital garden from the Adam Mickiewicz Institute launched on 29 March 2021 for the anniversary of his death.

1933 births
2020 deaths
People from Dębica
20th-century classical composers
21st-century classical composers
Microtonal composers
Polish classical composers
Polish male classical composers
Polish conductors (music)
Male conductors (music)
Polish opera composers
Male opera composers
Polish people of Armenian descent
Polish people of German descent
Yale School of Music faculty
Grammy Award winners
Members of the European Academy of Sciences and Arts
Members of the Academy of Arts, Berlin
Honorary Members of the Royal Academy of Music
Alumni of the Academy of Music in Kraków
Academic staff of the Academy of Music in Kraków
Commanders Crosses of the Order of Merit of the Federal Republic of Germany
Prix Italia winners
Wolf Prize in Arts laureates
Recipients of the Order of Polonia Restituta (1944–1989)
Recipients of the Austrian Decoration for Science and Art
Recipients of the Order of Merit of the Grand Duchy of Luxembourg
Recipients of the Praemium Imperiale
Recipients of the Grand Decoration for Services to the Republic of Austria
Officers of the Order of Merit of the Italian Republic
Members of the American Academy of Arts and Letters
EMI Classics and Virgin Classics artists
Emmy Award winners
Commandeurs of the Ordre des Arts et des Lettres
People associated with Dublin City University
Recipients of the Order of the Cross of Terra Mariana, 1st Class
Recipients of the Order pro Merito Melitensi
International Rostrum of Composers prize-winners
Herder Prize recipients
20th-century conductors (music)
21st-century conductors (music)
Academic staff of the Folkwang University of the Arts
20th-century male musicians
21st-century male musicians
Recipients of the State Award Badge (Poland)
Recipients of the Order of the White Eagle (Poland)
People from Bydgoszcz